Hair washing is the cosmetic act of keeping hair clean by washing it. To remove sebum from hair, some apply a surfactant, usually shampoo (sometimes soap) to their hair and lather the surfactant with water. The surfactant is rinsed out with water along with the dirt that it bonds to.

Furthermore, there are dry shampoos; powders that remove sebum from hair by soaking it up prior to being combed out. People often use dry shampoo if they would like to postpone their hair wash or simply to save time. 

Hair wash and dry shampoo keep the hair healthy, add volume to the hair, remove dirt and odors, and remove oils from the scalp.

Hairdressing

Most hairdressers in Canada, US and Europe and Latin America, offer a hair wash as a service before or after a haircut. This is usually done to make the hair more manageable for the hairdresser performing the haircut. After a haircut, it can remove loose strands of hair. It is also a relaxing practice, and many clients enjoy a hair wash as part of a haircut.

Hairdressers use specialized basins to perform a hair wash; these can be either forward or backward style. In the backward version (the more common), the client sits in a chair, and leans their head back into a sink, with the hairdresser standing behind them. In the forward version, the client leans forward over a sink, and the hairdresser stands over them to wash their hair.     

In some parts of the world, such as China, it is not uncommon to see what is referred to as an 'upright' shampoo. In this style, the client sits in a chair, while a hairdresser applies shampoo to their hair and adds water. They then rinse off into a basin.

See also 
 Hair care
 No poo
 Shampoo

References

External links 
 Back hair wash unit in operation

Hairdressing
Hygiene